The Brighton Strangler is a 1945 American crime film directed by Max Nosseck and starring John Loder, June Duprez and Michael St. Angel. During the blitz in wartime London, an actor suffers concussion and believes himself to be the character he has most recently been playing - a vicious strangler with a  hit list of potential victims.

Cast
 John Loder as Reginald Parker / Edward Grey
 June Duprez as April Manby Carson
 Michael St. Angel as Lieutenant Bob Carson
 Miles Mander as Chief Inspector W.R. Allison
 Rose Hobart as Dorothy Kent
 Gilbert Emery as Doctor Manby (final film)
 Rex Evans as Leslie Shelton
 Matthew Boulton as Inspector Graham
 Olaf Hytten as Banks, the valet
 Lydia Bilbrook as Mrs Manby
 Ian Wolfe as Lord Mayor
 Frank Mayo as Policeman (uncredited)

References

External links
 

1945 films
1945 crime drama films
American crime drama films
American black-and-white films
1940s English-language films
Films about actors
Films directed by Max Nosseck
Films set in Brighton and Hove
Films set in London
RKO Pictures films
American serial killer films
Films scored by Leigh Harline
1940s American films